In enzymology, a phosphoenolpyruvate-protein phosphotransferase is an enzyme that catalyzes the chemical reaction

phosphoenolpyruvate + protein histidine  pyruvate + protein Npi-phospho-L-histidine

Thus, the two substrates of this enzyme are phosphoenolpyruvate and protein histidine, whereas its two products are pyruvate and protein Npi-phospho-L-histidine.

This enzyme belongs to the family of transferases, specifically those transferring phosphorus-containing groups (phosphotransferases) with a nitrogenous group as acceptor.    This enzyme participates in phosphotransferase system (pts).

Nomenclature 

The systematic name of this enzyme class is phosphoenolpyruvate:protein-L-histidine Npi-phosphotransferase. Other names in common use include phosphoenolpyruvate sugar phosphotransferase enzyme I, phosphopyruvate-protein factor phosphotransferase, phosphopyruvate-protein phosphotransferase, sugar-PEP phosphotransferase enzyme I, and phosphoenolpyruvate:protein-L-histidine N-pros-phosphotransferase.

References 

 

EC 2.7.3
Enzymes of known structure